In mathematics, the tensor product of quadratic forms is most easily understood when one views the quadratic forms as quadratic spaces.

In particular, the form  satisfies

(which does uniquely characterize it however). It follows from this that if the quadratic forms are diagonalizable (which is always possible if 2 is invertible in R), i.e., 

then the tensor product has diagonalization

Quadratic forms
Tensors